A Dungeon Master is the organizer of a Dungeons & Dragons role-playing game.

Dungeon Master may also refer to:

Games
 Dungeon Master (video game), a 1987 video game series
 The Dungeon Master (video game), a 1983 video game for the ZX Spectrum
 Zork III: The Dungeon Master, a 1982 interactive fiction game

Film and television
 Dungeon Master, a character in Dungeons & Dragons (TV series)
 The Dungeonmaster, a 1984 film
 The Dungeon Masters, a 2008 documentary film

Other uses
Dungeon monitor, or dungeon master, a person charged with supervising a playspace at BDSM events
 The Dungeon Master: The Disappearance of James Dallas Egbert III, a 1985 non-fiction book by William Dear

See also
 Dungeon (disambiguation)